Tears for Water: Songbook of Poems and Lyrics is a collection of poems and lyrics written by American recording artist Alicia Keys. It was first issued in the United States as a hardcover edition by G. P. Putnam's Sons, on November 4, 2004. Later in November 2005, it was issued in Canada and Europe in paperback format by Berkley Books. The book consists of twenty-seven poems and lyrics to songs from her studio albums Songs in A Minor (2001) and The Diary of Alicia Keys (2003).

The book appeared on The New York Times Best Seller list and has generated over 500.000 dollars in sales. Another volume was planned for release in fall 2005. To promote the book, Keys appeared on The Early Show and at Barnes & Noble store where she signed copies of it. In 2006, she appeared on the television series Def Poetry Jam, citing the poem "P.O.W.". The book was re-released in October 2018 with a new cover.

Background and release

In late 2003, Keys released her second studio album The Diary of Alicia Keys to commercial and critical success. Following was a tour from March to April 2004, The Verizon Ladies First Tour, that she co-headlined with Beyoncé and Missy Elliott. In March 2004, it was reported that a dispute had broken out between literary agents Noah Lukeman and David Vigliano, with Lukeman claiming that he had the right over Vigliano to represent Keys for book publishers, possibly delaying the release of the book. In May 2004, it was announced that Keys had signed a deal to publish two books with G.P. Putnam's Sons, "Songbook" and "The Diary of Alicia Keys". The president of G.P. Putnam's Sons, Carole Baron, commented that "It isn't everyday you are offered the opportunity to publish someone as unbelievably talented as Alicia Keys. Her story is as inspiring as it is astonishing, and we are excited to be publishing her story, in her own words".

Keys explained that "[the book] won't be exactly autobiography, but I love to read so much that I want to make sure the story is really powerful, like Catcher in the Rye or one of the books I love". The title of the book is derived from one of the poems, "Love and Chains", which contains the line: "I don't mind drinking my tears for water". In an interview with The Early Show, Keys further explained that:

The poetry slam themed release party for the book was held at the Harlem Grill in New York City. The release party was hosted by Mums and featured appearances by Kanye West, Mos Def and Common.

Content 

 Poems
Golden Child 
P.O.W. 
6:33 a.m. 
Gold of Johannesburg 
Lilly of the Valley 
Beckoning Green 
Damn You! 
Mind Sex 
Love in Chains 
Unfulfilled Keys
Bus Ride Through a Periwinkle Sky
The Shore (You Sure?)
Constant Evolution of Going Nowhere
Love with a Shot of Distance
Cosmopolitan Woman
Still Water
Is It Insane?
In My Search for Heaven 
Mr. Jealousy 
Angel 
No Room for Religion
Such a Strong Word
Everywhere is Nowhere
Lady Malasuérte
Stolen Moment
4 Letter Word
When Gone is the Glory

 Lyrics from Songs in A Minor
Girlfriend 
Fallin' 
Troubles
Rock With You 
A Woman's Worth 
Jane Doe 
Goodbye 
The Life 
Mister Man 
Butterflyz 
Why Do I feel So Sad? 
Caged Bird 
Lovin' You
 Lyrics from The Diary of Alicia Keys
Karma 
Heartburn 
You Don't Know My Name 
If I Ain't Got You 
Diary 
Dragon Days 
Wake Up 
So Simple 
When You Really Love Someone 
Slow Down 
Samsonite Man 
Nobody, Not Really

Critical reception
Troy Patterson from Entertainment Weekly gave the book a C, stating that "her work would not pass muster in an introductory writing course at a four-year college." Publishers Weekly gave the book a positive review and wrote "nearly half of the book consists of lyrics from her two albums, Songs in A Minor and The Diary of Alicia Keys; while they make a nice complement to the poems, the words feel a bit flat without the blaxploitation beat of "Heartburn", say, or the impassioned vocal delivery of "Fallin'"". The review concluded that "for the Keys completist, however, this will be a compelling book of rock ephemera".

Release history

References

2004 books
Alicia Keys
2004 poetry books
American poetry collections